Cargill is a surname of Scottish origin, a sept of Clan Drummond. 

Notable people with the surname include:

Persons
Ann Cargill, an 18th-century British opera diva
Ansley Cargill, an American tennis player
Baily Cargill (born 1995), British football (soccer) player
C. Robert Cargill, an American novelist and screenwriter
Donald Cargill, a Scottish Covenanter
Edward Cargill, 19th century New Zealand politician
Helen Cargill Thompson, Scottish scientist, librarian, art collector and supporter of educational, artistic and heritage organisations
Henry Cargill, an Ontario farmer, merchant and political figure
Henson Cargill (1941–2007), American country music singer
Jimmy Cargill (1914-1939), Scottish football (soccer) player
James Cargill (musician) bassist for Broadcast
James R. Cargill (1923-2006) U.S. businessman
James R. Cargill II (born 1949) U.S. businessman
Sir John Cargill, 1st Baronet (1867-1954), Chairman of Burmah Oil Company
John Cargill (politician), 19th century New Zealand politician
John Cargill Thompson, Scottish dramatist specialising in one-person plays
Karen Cargill, a Scottish operatic mezzo-soprano singer
Lance Cargill, an American lawyer and Republican politician
Margaret Anne Cargill, billionaire philanthropist
Morris Cargill,  a white Jamaican lawyer, businessman, planter, journalist and novelist
Oscar Cargill (1898–1972), American literary critic and professor of English
O. A. Cargill, a lawyer, author and buffalo rancher
Patrick Cargill (1918-1996), a British actor
Peter Cargill, a Jamaican international football player
Wellington David Cargill, an Ontario manufacturer and political figure
William Cargill (Berwick MP) (1813–1894), British Conservative Party politician, MP for Berwick-upon-Tweed 1863–65
William Cargill (New Zealand politician), founder of the Otago settlement in New Zealand
William Wallace Cargill (1844-1909), founder of Cargill company in the U.S.

Fictional characters
Colonel Cargill, a fictional character in Joseph Heller's classic novel Catch-22
Callie Cargill, a fictional character from the TV show The Glades
Joanna Cargill, a fictional Marvel Comics character
Russ Cargill, fictional character, U.S. Environmental Protection Agency Head, and antagonist in The Simpsons Movie. Voiced by Albert Brooks.

Other
 Cargill family; a U.S. business family
 Cargill baronets; of Great Britain

See also

Cargill (disambiguation)

John Cargill Thompson (1938-2000), Scottish dramatist
Cargill Gilston Knott, a pioneer in seismological research

Surnames
Surnames of Scottish origin
Surnames of British Isles origin